Gagea sicula is an Italian flowering plant of the lily family. It has been found only on the Island of Sicily.

References

sicula
Flora of Sicily
Plants described in 1909